Metrowagonmash, also Metrovagonmash, is an engineering company in Mytishchi, Russia. Metrowagonmash (MWM) is one of the leading enterprises in Russia operating in the field of transport machine building. It specializes in development, designing and manufacturing of rolling stock for metro systems and railways. Metrowagonmash is part of Transmashholding.

In May 2009 its Mytishchi Machine-building Factory was spun off as a separate truck and armored vehicle manufacturing company.

History 

The plant was founded in 1897 (in the village of Big Mytishchi) to manufacture railcars, first for the Russian North Railway. Tramways and snowplows for Moscow have been produced since 1903, electric passenger trains since 1929 and metro-cars since 1934.

During World War II, self-propelled guns, military tractors, tracked vehicles and other military material were produced. The plant was partially evacuated to the Ural region in October 1941. The equipment was back the following year. In 1947, production of dump trucks was started. The company later concentrated on production of subway cars, dump trucks and armored tracked vehicles (e.g. GM chassises). A number of models of Metrovagonmash subway cars have been deployed in nearly every subway (Metro) system of the former Soviet Union, as well as in Budapest, Prague, Sofia and Warsaw.

In 1999 the plant started manufacturing rail buses as well. The plant also manufactured 137 RA2 Multiple Units between 2006 and 2008. Today Metrowagonmash is among the five thousand top enterprises in the country.

List of products
Metrowagonmash is the leading manufacturer of cars for metro systems of large cities of the CIS countries and of several Eastern European states. The enterprise has mastered manufacture of Light Rail cars designed for the lines of the Moscow Metro. Other specific products for the plant are rail buses. These vehicles are relatively new for the domestic railways and are designed for operation on suburban and interregional non-electrified routes.

Rolling stock
As of 2017, Metrowagonmash produces the following models of rolling stock:
 Metro 81-717.2K/714.2K
 Metro 81-722/723/724 "Jubileyny"
 Metro 81-765/766/767 "Moscow"
 Tram 71-931M "Vityaz"

Gallery

See also
 Rolling stock manufacturers of Russia
 The Museum of the Moscow Railway
 Transmashholding

References and sources

External links 
 
  (en, ru)
  (ru)
 Company profile on the Transmashholding website (en, ru)

Manufacturing companies of Russia
Manufacturing companies of the Soviet Union
Defence companies of the Soviet Union
Rail vehicle manufacturers of Russia
Russian brands
Manufacturing companies established in 1897
Mytishchinsky District
Transmashholding
Companies based in Moscow Oblast
1897 establishments in the Russian Empire
Companies nationalised by the Soviet Union